This is a list of supermarket chains in Denmark.

Norwegian NorgesGruppen owns a 49% stake in Dagrofa.

Supermarkets 
The following table contains summarising information about the supermarket chains that operate in Denmark as of November 2021.

Defunct supermarkets
Brugsen
Eurospar
Iso (supermarket)
Kiwi
SuperBest
LokalBrugsen
Fakta (by end of 2022)

References

Supermarkets
Denmark
Supermarkets